Latur City Assembly constituency is one of the 288 Vidhan Sabha (legislative assembly) constituencies of Maharashtra state in western India. This constituency is located in the Latur district. It is the 16th largest city in Maharashtra with district headquarter located in the city. The district comes under Marathwada region of Maharashtra, geographically located between 17°52′ North to 18°50′ North and 76°18′ East to 79°12′ East in the Deccan plateau. It has an average elevation of 631 metres (2,070 ft) above mean sea level. The entire district is on the Balaghat plateau, 540 to 638 metres from the mean sea level.

Cabinet Minister for Medical education & Cultural affairs, Amit Vilasrao Deshmukh is the current MLA of the constituency, representing the Indian National Congress.

History 
After the delimitation of the legislative assembly constituencies in 2008, the erstwhile Latur Assembly constituency was divided into Latur City and Latur Rural constituencies.

In Latur City Assembly constituency the Indian National Congress party is the strongest party.

Vilasrao Deshmukh, Former Chief Minister of Maharashtra, represented the seat five times in the Maharashtra Legislative Assembly. He was elected for three consecutive terms from the seat till 1995. From 1999, he was elected for two consecutive terms till 2008.

Members of Legislative Assembly

Election results

Assembly elections 2019

Assembly elections 2014

Assembly elections 2009

Assembly elections 1957

Assembly elections 1962

References

Assembly constituencies of Latur district
Latur
Assembly constituencies of Maharashtra